Bharatiya Janata Party, Bihar (or BJP Bihar) is a state unit of the Bharatiya Janata Party in Bihar. Sanjay Jaiswal is the current president of the BJP Bihar.

Electoral History

Legislative Assembly election

Lok Sabha election

Leadership

Deputy Chief Minister

Leader of the Opposition Legislative Assembly

Leader of the Opposition Legislative Council

President

See also
 Bharatiya Janata Party
 National Democratic Alliance
 Rashtriya Lok Janshakti Party
 Bharatiya Janata Party, Gujarat
 Bharatiya Janata Party, Uttar Pradesh
 Bharatiya Janata Party, Madhya Pradesh
 State units of the Bharatiya Janata Party

References 

Bharatiya Janata Party
Bihar
Bihar